Mirza Zahira Tafreshi (died before 1702) was an Iranian theologian and poet, who was active during the reigns of Shah Abbas II, Shah Soleyman, and Shah Soltan Hoseyn. He was born in the town of Tafresh (south-east of Tehran), and was the son of the prominent scholar Molla Morad Tafreshi (died 1641/2). Tafreshi was educated in the capital of Isfahan under the tutelage of the distinguished philosopher Agha Hossein Khansari (died 1687). During the reign of Shah Abbas II, Tafreshi was selected as the prayer leader of the northwestern province of Georgia. He was sent to the province along with its newly appointed vali (governor) Shah Nazar Khan. During his stay in Georgia, Tafreshi engaged in various interreligious discussions with Roman Catholic and Melkite leaders.

Tafreshi could speak Persian, Arabic and Azeri Turkish, the latter which may have been his native language. The death date of Tafreshi is uncertain; the latest record of him is in the colophon of a copy of his Matali u magharib, composed in 1702.

References

Sources 
 

People from Tafresh
17th-century writers of Safavid Iran
Year of birth unknown
Year of death unknown
Safavid theologians